The Midnight Patrol is a 1932 American pre-Code drama film, directed by Christy Cabanne. It stars Regis Toomey, Betty Bronson, and Edwina Booth, and was released on April 10, 1932. Written by George Jeske (screenplay) and Arthur Hoeri (story).

Plot
A rookie officer boasts his ability to solve a crime within 24 hours. Novice policemen Stanley and Oliver are found eating lunch in their patrol car, and run into two thieves attempting to steal their spare tire. Amidst the commotion, the two officers miss the broadcast address of a jewelry store burglary in progress. Officer Stanley asks whom he assumes to be the jewelry store owner for his phone to call the station, but the supposed owner turns out to be the very safecracker they were intending to bring in to custody. Eventually Officers Stanley and Oliver catch the apparent burglar and bring him back to the station, only to find it's really the police chief.

Cast
 Regis Toomey as Johnny Martin
 Betty Bronson as Ellen Grey
 Edwina Booth as Joyce Greeley
 Mary Nolan as Miss Willing
 Earle Foxe as Judson
 Robert Elliott as Howard Brady
 Eddie Kane as Stuart
 William Norton Bailey as Powers
 Mischa Auer as Dummy Black

References

External links 
 
 
 

Films directed by Christy Cabanne
Monogram Pictures films
American drama films
1932 drama films
1932 films
American black-and-white films
1930s American films